Marco Schneuwly (born 27 March 1985) is a Swiss footballer who plays as a striker for Aarau in the Swiss Challenge League, the second tier of football in Switzerland.

He is a former youth international and was in the Swiss U-17 squad that won the 2002 U-17 European Championships.

Personal life
His brother Christian Schneuwly is also a footballer. The siblings have played together for BSC Young Boys, FC Thun and FC Luzern.

Honours
 UEFA U-17 European Champion: 2002

References

1985 births
Living people
Association football forwards
Swiss men's footballers
Switzerland youth international footballers
Switzerland under-21 international footballers
BSC Young Boys players
FC Sion players
FC Thun players
SC Kriens players
FC Luzern players
Swiss Super League players
FC Fribourg players
Sportspeople from the canton of Fribourg